Armesto is a surname of Spanish origin. People with that name include:

 Marie-Rose Armesto (1960-2007), Spanish-born Belgian journalist
 Sebastian Armesto (born 1982), British film, television and theatre actor

See also
 
 Felipe Fernández-Armesto (born 1950), British historian

Surnames of Spanish origin